The Supreme Court of Missouri is the highest court in the state of Missouri. It was established in 1820 and is located at 207 West High Street in Jefferson City, Missouri. Missouri voters have approved changes in the state's constitution to give the Supreme Court exclusive jurisdiction – the sole legal power to hear – over five types of cases on appeal. Pursuant to Article V, Section 3 of the Missouri Constitution, these cases involve:

The validity of a United States statute or treaty.
The validity of a Missouri statute or constitutional provision.
The state's revenue laws.
Challenges to a statewide elected official's right to hold office.
Imposition of the death penalty.

Unless their case involves one of those five issues, people who want a trial court's decision reviewed must appeal to the Missouri Court of Appeals. Most of these cases involve routine legal questions and end there. The Court of Appeals is divided geographically into the Eastern District, Western District and Southern District.

Certain cases, however, can be transferred to the Supreme Court – at the Court's discretion – if it determines that a question of general interest or importance is involved, that the laws should be re-examined, or that the lower court's decision conflicts with an earlier appellate decision. This is similar to the process the United States Supreme Court uses in accepting cases. In addition, the Court of Appeals may transfer a case to the Supreme Court after an opinion is issued, either upon application of one of the parties or at the request of one of the judges on the appellate panel.

In addition to issuing legal decisions, the Supreme Court supervises the lower state courts with the assistance of the Office of State Courts Administrator ("OSCA"). OSCA oversees court programs, provides technical assistance, manages the budget of the state's judicial branch, and conducts educational programs. The Supreme Court also issues practice and procedure rules for Missouri court cases, including procedure and evidence rules. The Supreme Court licenses attorneys practicing in Missouri, and disciplines lawyers and judges for violating ethical rules.

Judicial selection
Judges of the court are selected through the Missouri Nonpartisan Court Plan, nationally known as the Missouri Plan.

Under the plan, the Appellate Judicial Commission submits the names of three nominees to the governor. If the governor fails to make an appointment with 60 days of the nominees being named, the Commission shall make the appointment. Judges serving for at least a year are placed on the general election ballot for a retention vote of the people. If retained, judges serve a term of 12 years.

At the time of its establishment, the court had three judges, which was expanded to five in 1872, and seven in 1890.

Notable cases 
The following is a list of notable cases decided by the Supreme Court of Missouri or which came to the Supreme Court of the United States from the Supreme Court of Missouri. Since 1973, the Supreme Court of Missouri has heard all cases en banc (before all seven judges). Before that many cases were heard by panels of three judges. Cases heard en banc are cited as "Mo. banc"; older cases heard by a panel are cited as "Mo."

Cruzan v. Director, Missouri Department of Health, 760 S.W.2d 408 (Mo. banc 1988), 497 U.S. 261 (1990)
Euthanasia, right to die; holding that it requires "clear and convincing evidence" to remove a person's life support; affirmed by the Supreme Court of the United States.
Missouri v. McNeely, 358 S. W. 3d 65 (Mo. banc 2012), 569 U.S. ___ (2013)
Fourth Amendment, warrantless search of a blood sample; holding that nonconsensual warrantless blood draw violates the Fourth Amendment's right to be free from unreasonable searches of his or her person; affirmed by the Supreme Court of the United States.
Doe v. Phillips, 194 S.W.3d 837 (Mo. banc 2006)
Sex offender registry; holding that applying Missouri's sex offender registration laws to anyone who had been convicted or pleaded guilty to a registrable offense before Missouri's sex offender registration law was passed in 1995 violates the Constitution of Missouri's unique bar on "laws retrospective in operation." Doe and its progeny constitute one of the few successful constitutional challenges to sex offender registration laws in the United States.
Dred Scott v. Sandford, 15 Mo. 576 (1852), 60 U.S. (19 How.) 393 (1856)
Slavery; holding that slaves taken into free states remained slaves; affirmed by the Supreme Court of the United States, creating a precursor to the American Civil War.
Drope v. Missouri, 462 S.W.2d 677 (Mo. banc 1971), 420 U.S. 162 (1975)
Competency; holding that the fact that a criminal defendant attempted suicide before trial does not constitute reasonable doubt as to his competency; reversed by the Supreme Court of the United States.
Lavender v. Kurn, 354 Mo. 196, 189 S.W.2d 253 (1945), 327 U.S. 645 (1946)
Evidence; holding that Due Process demands that an inference of negligence is not enough to send a case to a jury in a tort case; reversed by the Supreme Court of the United States.
Minor v. Happersett, 53 Mo. 58 (1873), 88 U.S. 162 (1875)
Women's suffrage; holding that the Equal Protection Clause of the Fourteenth Amendment does not guarantee a woman the right to vote; affirmed by the Supreme Court of the United States.
Missouri ex rel. Gaines v. Canada, 342 Mo. 121, 113 S.W.2d 783 (1938), 305 U.S. 337 (1938)
Racial segregation; holding that a state which provides only one educational institution need not allow blacks and whites to attend if there is no separate school for blacks; reversed by the Supreme Court of the United States as not meeting the separate but equal standard of Plessy v. Ferguson.
Missouri v. Seibert, 93 S.W.3d 700 (Mo. banc 2002), 542 U.S. 600 (2004)
Miranda warnings; holding that Missouri's practice of interrogating suspects without reading them a Miranda warning, then reading them a Miranda warning and asking them to repeat their confession is unconstitutional; affirmed by the Supreme Court of the United States.
Rachel v. Walker, 4 Mo. 350 (1836)
Slavery; holding that slaves taken into free states became free; overturned twenty years later by Dred Scott v. Sandford.
Roper v. Simmons, 112 S.W.3d 397 (Mo. banc 2003), 543 U.S. 551 (2005)
Capital punishment; holding that the Eighth and Fourteenth Amendments forbid imposition of the death penalty on offenders who were under the age of 18 when their crimes were committed; affirmed by the Supreme Court of the United States.
Shelley v. Kraemer, 198 S.W.2d 679 (Mo. banc 1947), 334 U.S. 1 (1948)
Racial segregation; holding that the Fourteenth Amendment does not prohibit a state from enforcing restrictive covenants which would prohibit a person from owning or occupying property on the basis of race or color; reversed by the Supreme Court of the United States.
State v. Mitchell, 170 Mo. 633, 71 S.W. 175 (1902)
Attempt and impossibility defense; holding that factual impossibility is not a defense to the crime of attempt. Mitchell is a seminal case in the United States in this area of the law.

Current judges 

Robin Ransom is the latest appointee to the Court, having been appointed by Missouri Governor Mike Parson in May 2021. The judges rotate the two-year term of Chief Justice among themselves. The Chief Justice is Constitutionally empowered to preside over the court and to be the "chief administrative officer" of the state judicial system. The Chief Justice is Paul C. Wilson, whose term began July 1, 2021 and will serve until June 30, 2023.

Vacancies and pending nominations

Clerk of the Supreme Court of Missouri 
The Clerk of the Supreme Court of Missouri is responsible for a wide range of duties, including the supervision of the internal administrative function of the Court itself as well as the planning and administrative direction of the Missouri Judicial Conference, the organization of all the state's judges. As of January 1, 2017, the clerk is Betsy AuBuchon, the first woman to serve in that position.

References

External links
Supreme Court of Missouri web page
Publications by or about the Supreme Court of Missouri at Internet Archive.

Missouri
Missouri state courts
1820 establishments in Missouri Territory
Courts and tribunals established in 1820